Vitamin C is the debut studio album by pop singer Vitamin C, released in 1999. The album was a runaway success. Initially failing to chart, it later climbed the Billboard 200 to number 29 and was certified as Gold and later certified Platinum by the RIAA. The Japanese edition featured the song "The Only One" as a bonus track.

The album spawned two hits, the Gold-selling top 20 hit "Smile" and the Top 40 hit "Graduation (Friends Forever)". The album features guest appearances by Lady Saw, Count Bass D, and Waymon Boone. On the track "Fear of Flying" Vitamin C samples The Clash's "The Magnificent Seven".

Critical reception
The album elicited generally positive reviews from music critics upon its release. Tom Demalon, writing for AllMusic, gave the album four stars and likewise praised her range, adding that "there is no shortage of hooks" on the album and concluding that "there's not a weak track on this stellar record." Entertainment Weekly gave the album an "A−" and called that the album "the unabashedly great pop album the Spice Girls might have made (but never quite did)."

However, some critics were less favorable in their assessments of the album. Rolling Stone's Neva Chonin awarded the album two and a half stars, praising the album's stylistic range but criticizing its production, which she felt "makes it difficult to tell where the cut-and-paste production ends and Vitamin C begins."

Track listing

Personnel

Charts

Weekly charts

Year-end charts

Certifications

References

1999 debut albums
Elektra Records albums
Vitamin C (singer) albums
Pop albums by American artists
Pop rock albums by American artists